Baegunbong is a mountain in Gyeonggi-do, South Korea. It sits on the boundary between the communities of Yangpyeong and Okcheon in the county of Yangpyeong.

See also
List of mountains in Korea

Notes

References

Mountains of Gyeonggi Province
Yangpyeong County
Mountains of South Korea